Thierry de Brunhoff (born 9 November 1934) is a French pianist and Benedictine monk.

Biography 
Thierry de Brunhoff is the son of Jean and Cécile de Brunhoff, creators of Babar the elephant, and younger brother of Laurent de Brunhoff.

He started taking piano lessons from Alfred Cortot at the age of 11. Cortot was his greatest musical influence, as he testified several times:  Thereafter he also studied with Edwin Fischer, before becoming a teacher himself at the École normale de musique de Paris for over ten years. Among his students was Hüseyin Sermet.

He is particularly known for his interpretations of Chopin and Schumann (one senses in this the very deep mark of his first master, Cortot), but his repertoire is very broad, from Beethoven to Debussy and Ravel, through Carl Maria von Weber, whose ostracism Brunhoff regrets, even the condescension with which he would be treated by musicians.

His preference, however, goes to Chopin, whom he praises in these terms: 

In this regard, he declared in 2004 in a letter to Rodolphe Bruneau-Boulmier: 

He was also a devoted fan of Maria Callas.

Pianist and radio producer Philippe Cassard devoted several series of programs to Thierry de Brunhoff on France Musique between 2008 and 2015.

Discography 
In 2004, EMI Classics published a double record in the series "Les Rarissimes", with interpretations of works by Chopin, Weber and Schumann, revealing this pianist who was almost forgotten at the time.

References

External links 
 Que viva Thierry de Brunhoff ! Mediapart (8 November 2014)
 Le piano de Thierry de Brunhoff (Le Monde) (16 April 2010)
 Thierry de Brunhoff on AllMusic
 Hommage à Thierry de Brunhoff pour ses 80 ans on France Musique, 8 November 2014
 Thierry de Brunhoff, fils du papa de Babar on Théâtre des Champs-Élysées
 Thierry de Brunhoff on Discogs
 Thierry de Brunhoff performs Von Weber (1967), Invitation à la danse, Sonata n°2 (YouTube)

20th-century French male classical pianists
French Benedictines
Academic staff of the École Normale de Musique de Paris
1934 births
Living people